The 2022–23 season is Queen's Park's first season in Scottish Championship following their promotion from League One at the end of the 2021–22 season. Queen's also competed in the Scottish Cup, League Cup, Challenge Cup and Glasgow Cup.

Summary 
On 25 March 2022, Queen's announced the appointment of Owen Coyle as their new head coach who would take up the position from June 1st.

On 25 May 2022, Queen's announced the team would play their League Cup home ties at Ochilview Park, as the redevelopment of Lesser Hampden was unable to be completed before the start of the new season. 

On 13 June 2022, the club started a new initiative to facilitate and stimulate the further flow of academy players. Starting from this season, the first team will be playing with a development team, Young Queen’s Park.

Results and fixtures

Pre-season and friendlies

Scottish Championship

Scottish League Cup

Group stage

Scottish Challenge Cup

Scottish Cup 

Queen's Park initially progressed to the fifth round of the Scottish Cup, but were expelled from the competition after fielding an ineligible player in their fourth round match with Inverness.

Glasgow Cup

Group stage

Player statistics 

|-
! colspan=16 style=background:#dcdcdc; text-align:center| First Team

|-
! colspan=16 style=background:#dcdcdc; text-align:center| Young Queen's Park

|}

Team statistics

Championship table

League Cup table

Glasgow Cup table

Transfers

Players in

Players out

Loans in

Loans out

See also 
List of Queen's Park F.C. seasons

References 

Queen's Park
Queen's Park F.C. seasons